Natja Brunckhorst (born 26 September 1966) is a German actress, screenwriter, and director.
Brunckhorst was 13 years old when she was selected by director Uli Edel for the leading role as Christiane F. in the critically acclaimed 1981 dramatisation of the biographical work Christiane F. - Wir Kinder vom Bahnhof Zoo by Christiane Vera Felscherinow, written following the tape recordings of the experiences of teenage girl Christiane F. The film immediately acquired cult status (which it still retains today) and features David Bowie as both himself and the soundtrack composer, which gave the film a commercial boost. A year later Brunckhorst appeared in Rainer Werner Fassbinder's Querelle (1982). After the unexpected success of Christiane F. - Wir Kinder vom Bahnhof Zoo, in order to avoid public attention she retreated from public life and went to school in England. After a short time in Paris she returned to Germany in 1987 to study at the Schauspielschule Bochum. Since then she has acted on film and television, for example in The Princess and the Warrior, as well as the German TV series Dr. Sommerfeld – Neues vom Bülowbogen.

Following a recovery from cancer which caused a break in her acting career, in 1998, Brunckhorst began working as a scriptwriter, first for the television series Einsatz Hamburg Süd. Her biographical film  was awarded the Lola for the best script in 2001. In the same year her first work as a director was published, La Mer, a playful-romantic short film. In addition, she still appears in movies, such as her part in 2000 alongside  Franka Potente and Benno Fürmann in the movie The Princess and the Warrior. In Totem, the only German contribution to the Venice Film Festival in 2011, she embodied a woman in desperation for the speechlessness of her family.

Brunckhorst has one daughter: Emma (born 1991), from a relationship with German actor Dominic Raacke that lasted from 1988 to 1993. She currently lives in Munich.

Natja Brunckhorst is a member of the high-IQ society Mensa.

Awards
 Deutscher Drehbuchpreis (German screenplay prize) LOLA 2001: Never Mind the Wall
 Goldener Spatz im Wettbewerb Kino-TV als Bester deutschsprachiger Spielfilm für Kinder (Best German language film for children; Amelie rennt)

Filmography
 1981: Christiane F. – Wir Kinder vom Bahnhof Zoo
 1982: Querelle
 1987: Kinder aus Stein
 1989: Tiger, Lion, Panther
 1989: Der Fuchs (TV series, episode 7: Schach und Rauch)
 1990: Spitzen der Gesellschaft
 1991: Babylon
 1993: Die Skrupellosen – Hörigkeit des Herzens
 1994: Die Kommissarin  (TV series, episode 11: Corinna)
 1995: Eine fast perfekte Liebe
 1995: Das verletzte Lächeln
 1995: Pack mich (short)
 1995: Alles außer Mord: Y.?17
 1996: Das verletzte Lächeln
 1997: Virus X – Der Atem des Todes
 1997: Rendezvous (short)
 1997: 
 1997: Kalte Küsse
 1998: Einsatz Hamburg Süd (TV series, screenplay)
 2000: The Princess and the Warrior
 2001:  (screenplay)
 2002: La Mer (director und screenplay)
 2009: Tatort:  (screenplay)
 2009: Mein
 2010: Leipzig Homicide: Wut im Bauch (actress)
 2010: Wie ein Stern am Himmel (screenplay)
 2011: Totem (actress)
 2012: Tatort:  (Idea, screenplay)
 2017: Amelie rennt (screenplay)

External links

Website von Natja Brunckhorst

References

1966 births
Living people
Actresses from Berlin
German film actresses
German television actresses
20th-century German actresses
21st-century German actresses